The Baptism of Christ (Italian: Battesimo di Cristo) is a religious painting by Titian, dated to about 1512, in the collection of the Capitoline Museums, Rome.

Description 
In the Baptism of Christ, John the Baptist (top left) rests on Jesus (centre), and the donor, the Venetian Giovanni Ram (bottom right), whom the artist was obliged to introduce into the picture, is connected by a glance with the patron Saint. According to Ricketts, in 1910 the picture was "darkened in part", but the condition was "otherwise good".

Date 
Titian painted the Baptism of Christ at the end of his Giorgionesque period, about 1510 to 1512. Though the picture is described by Marc Antonio Michiel (the Anonimo Morelliano), who saw it, in 1531, in the house of Giovanni Ram (Messer Zuan Ram), the donor of it, it is not accepted by Crowe and Cavalcaselle, but ascribed to Paris Bordone. Morelli restored it to Titian.

Analysis 

Gronau and Ricketts both compare the figure of John in the Baptism of Christ (Gallery of the Capitol, Rome),—who kneels, supporting himself by his hand, and in this attitude, the upper part of his body bending forwards, completes the act of baptism,—with the figure of the shepherd in the Adoration of the Shepherds (National Gallery, London), "a more noble figure than the shepherd," says Gronau, "but bearing to him, we might say, the strongest family likeness." The same figure recurs in the Three Ages (Scottish National Gallery, Edinburgh).

References

Sources 

 Gronau, Georg (1904). Titian. London: Duckworth and Co; New York: Charles Scribner's Sons. pp. 10, 31–33, 295.
 Ricketts, Charles (1910). Titian. London: Methuen & Co. Ltd. pp. 42–43, 181, plate xxii.
 "Battesimo di Cristo". Musei Capitolini. Retrieved 7 March 2023.

External links 

 

Religious paintings by Titian
Paintings of the Baptism of Christ